Glenn is an unincorporated community and census-designated place in southwestern Heard County, Georgia, United States. It lies along local roads southwest of the city of Franklin, the county seat of Heard County. Its elevation is 820 feet (250 m), and it is located at  (33.1542875, -85.2029992).

It first appeared as a CDP in the 2020 Census with a population of 101.

History

Glenn was named for Mr. George Glenn, one of the early white settlers in the area. Mr. Glenn operated a tanning yard, which was one of the first industries in the area.

The post office was established in 1887, with Mr. Thomas S. DeLoach as the first postmaster.

Demographics

2020 census

Note: the US Census treats Hispanic/Latino as an ethnic category. This table excludes Latinos from the racial categories and assigns them to a separate category. Hispanics/Latinos can be of any race.

Gallery

References

Unincorporated communities in Heard County, Georgia
Census-designated places in Heard County, Georgia